Gene Eniar Englund (October 21, 1917 – November 5, 1995) was an American professional basketball player. He played in the National Basketball Association (NBA) for one season, and split the season playing for the Boston Celtics and Tri-Cities Blackhawks. Although he played professionally, Englund is best remembered for being a star college basketball player for Wisconsin, where as a senior in 1940–41 he led the Badgers to win the NCAA national championship.

Early life
Englund was born in Kenosha, Wisconsin. He attended Kenosha High School in Kenosha where he graduated in 1936. When deciding where to play college basketball, he decided to stick close to home and enrolled at the University of Wisconsin (now University of Wisconsin–Madison).

College
He broke out during his senior season in 1940–41 when he was team captain. He scored 162 points in Big Ten Conference games, which set a new conference scoring record at the time, and was also named the Big Ten MVP. Additionally, he (alongside star teammate John Kotz) led Wisconsin to the school's first and only men's basketball national championship when they defeated Washington State, 39–34. At the end of the season Englund was named a consensus Second Team All-American.

Professional career
When Englund graduated from college in the spring of 1941, the major professional basketball league was the National Basketball League (NBL). From the 1941–42 season through the 1943–44 one, and again from 1946 to 1949, he played for the NBL's Oshkosh All-Stars (in 1943–44 he also played for the American Basketball League's Brooklyn Indians). Englund won the NBL Championship as a rookie in 1941–42, leading his team in scoring while making seven field goals and three free throws en route to 17 points. The All-Stars also lost the NBL championships in 1942–43 and 1945–46 while Englund played for them. Although he was never a superstar in the league, he did manage to finish third all-time in NBL points scored when the league merged with the Basketball Association of America (BAA) in 1949, resulting in the formation of the present-day NBA. Most of the way into the 1948–49 season with Oshkosh, then-coach Lon Darling resigned and Englund took over as a player-coach for the remainder of the year. He compiled a 3–1 regular season record and a 3–4 playoffs record as coach.

At age 32 in 1949–50, Englund was well past his basketball playing prime. He lasted only one season in the NBA, splitting the year with first the Boston Celtics and then the Tri-Cities Blackhawks. After playing in 24 games for the Celtics while averaging 8.2 points per game, he was traded on January 29, 1950 for John Mahnken. Englund finished the year out by appearing in 22 games for Tri-Cities and averaged 7.5 points per game.

Later life
After his playing career was over, Englund became an official for the Big Ten and NBA. He died on November 5, 1995 in Winnebago, Wisconsin.

NBA career statistics

Regular season

Playoffs

References

External links

NBL stats

1917 births
1995 deaths
All-American college men's basketball players
American Basketball League (1925–1955) players
American men's basketball players
Basketball coaches from Wisconsin
Basketball players from Wisconsin
Boston Celtics players
Centers (basketball)
Forwards (basketball)
National Basketball Association referees
Oshkosh All-Stars coaches
Oshkosh All-Stars players
Player-coaches
Sportspeople from Kenosha, Wisconsin
Sportspeople from Oshkosh, Wisconsin
Tri-Cities Blackhawks players
Undrafted National Basketball Association players
Wisconsin Badgers men's basketball players
Mary D. Bradford High School alumni